ʽAm is the Biblical Hebrew for "people, nation, tribe". It may refer to:
The Jewish people
another people or nation, usually in plural (ʽamim); see goyim
ʽAm haʼaretz "common people, pagans"
Any of the Tribes of Israel